Albert Manahi Kewene (born ) is a retired New Zealand Māori dentist.

In 1965, he was the first Māori to become a registered dentist, and he was the first Māori to graduate in periodontics from Otago Medical School in 1974. Of Tainui descent, his uncle was Manahi Nitama Paewai. In the later part of his career he worked for Māori healthcare providers and served on Te Ao Marama, the New Zealand Māori Dental Association. Kewene retired in 2014.

Kewene was preceded in dentistry by Walter Morete, who was the first Māori to graduate with a Bachelor of Dental Surgery in 1928, before registration.

References

1930s births
Living people
New Zealand dentists
People from Dannevirke
Periodontists
Waikato Tainui people
University of Otago alumni